Risøy or Risøya is an island in Haugesund municipality in Rogaland county, Norway.  The  island lies in the Karmsund strait immediately south of the island of Hasseløy and southeast of the island of Vibrandsøy.  Risøy is part of the town of Haugesund. The west side of the island is dominated by the docks, workshops, and industrial hall belonging to Aibel. Other offshore corporations also have offices on the southeast part of the island.  The ferry to Utsira operates from the Garpaskjær dock north on the island.

While the neighboring island of Hasseløy to the north received its bridge to the mainland in 1872, Risøy was only connected to the mainline by ferry for many years. One of the local ferrymen, Ola Flytt, has been honored with a statue and a street name on the island. Industrial development of the island began in earnest during the 1930s. At this time, Risøy was densely populated, with approximately 3000 residents. The development included the deepwater dock at Garpaskjær that could accommodate large ships. The road bridge from the mainland to the island was completed in 1939. Residential housing still makes up much of the east side of the island. The island has a 2014 population of 527.

See also
List of islands of Norway

References

Islands of Rogaland
Haugesund